Michael Hughes (born August 7, 1959) is a Canadian rower. He won a bronze medal in the Quadruple Sculls event at the 1984 Summer Olympics.

References

1959 births
Living people
Canadian male rowers
Olympic bronze medalists for Canada
Olympic medalists in rowing
Olympic rowers of Canada
Rowers at the 1984 Summer Olympics
Rowers from St. Catharines
Medalists at the 1984 Summer Olympics
20th-century Canadian people